In mathematics, a Shintani zeta function or Shintani L-function is a generalization of the Riemann zeta function. They include Hurwitz zeta functions and Barnes zeta functions.

Definition
The Shintani zeta function in the variable  is given by (the meromorphic continuation of)

The multi-variable version 
The definition of Shintani zeta function has a straightforward generalization to a zeta function in several variables  given byThe special case when k = 1 is the Barnes zeta function.

Relation to Witten zeta functions 
Just like Shintani zeta functions, Witten zeta functions are defined by polynomials which are products of linear forms with non-negative coefficients. Witten zeta functions are however not special cases of Shintani zeta functions because in Witten zeta functions the linear forms are allowed to have some coefficients equal to zero.  For example, the polynomial  defines the Witten zeta function of  but the linear form  has -coefficient equal to zero.

References

Zeta and L-functions